, also known as , was a Japanese daimyō of the late Sengoku through early Edo periods. Renowned as a man of great ambition, he succeeded Takenaka Hanbei as a chief strategist and adviser to Toyotomi Hideyoshi. Kuroda became a Christian when he was 38, and received "Simeon Josui" as a baptismal name (rekishijin). His quick wit, bravery, and loyalty were respected by his warriors.

Early life

Kuroda Yoshitaka was born in Himeji (姫路) on December 22, 1546, as Mankichi (万吉), the son of Kuroda Mototaka. The Kuroda clan are believed to have originated in Ōmi Province. Yoshitaka's grandfather Shigetaka brought the family to Himeji and took up residence at Gochaku Castle (御着城), east of Himeji Castle.

Shigetaka served as a senior retainer of Kodera Masamoto, the lord of Himeji, and was so highly praised that Shigetaka's son Mototaka was allowed to marry Masamoto's adopted daughter (Akashi Masakaze’s daughter) and to use the Kodera name. Yoshitaka became the head of the Kuroda family at the age of 21 when his father, Mototaka, retired.
Yoshitaka succeeded to the family headship in 1557.

Military life

Service under Nobunaga
In 1567, he fought in the Siege of Inabayama Castle against the Saitō clan.  A few years later, with Toyotomi Hideyoshi spearheading the Oda clan's advance into the Chūgoku region, he pledged loyalty to the Oda. 

In 1576, Yoshitaka, together with the sickly Takenaka Hanbei, served as Hideyoshi's strategists and assisted in the Chugoku campaign against the Mōri clan.

In 1578, Arioka/Itami Castle's lord, Araki Murashige, concluded an alliance with the Mōri to revolt against the Oda. An allied Kodera Masamoto also hatched a plot to cooperate with Araki. Then, Kuroda went to Arioka castle to prevail on Araki not to defect.  Araki chose to imprison Yoshitaka instead. 

Araki's revolt eventually concluded in 1579 at the Siege of Itami, culminating in Yoshitaka's rescue. Due to his long imprisonment (with lack of space for sleeping and sitting), Yoshitaka suffered a leg disorder and lost his eyesight in one eye for the rest of his life.

In 1582, he fought in the Siege of Takamatsu against the Mōri clan.

Service under Hideyoshi
He fought at the Battle of Yamazaki in 1582 under Hideyoshi, avenging the death of Oda Nobunaga.

He participated in the Battle of Shizugatake in 1583 and the Battle of Komaki-Nagakute in 1584. Also led Toyotomi forced in the campaign to conquer Shikoku in 1585.

Shortly before 1587, Yoshitaka was ordered by Hideyoshi to lead an attack into Siege of Kagoshima at Kyushu. Along with him was the Christian daimyō Takayama Ukon. After seeing the thriving Christian population of Kyushu, under Ukon's influence, Yoshitaka was baptized with the name ドン・シメオン (Dom Simeão = Don Simeon). After a visit to the Jesuit-controlled port of Nagasaki, Hideyoshi became fearful of the powerful influence that Jesuits and the Christian daimyōs wielded.

In 1587, he made his famous edict that expelled foreign missionaries and ordered all the Christian samurai under his rule to abandon their faith. While Ukon resisted the edict and lost his status, Yoshitaka gave up his new religion and adopted a monk's habit, calling himself Josui (如水). Like Naitō Joan (who took his name from Portuguese João), it is believed that Yoshitaka chose his new name from "Josué", the Portuguese version of "Joshua". His most prominent act during his short time as a Christian was his arrangement to save a Jesuit mission from Bungo when the Christian daimyō of that province, Ōtomo Sōrin, was under attack from the Shimazu clan.

Sekigahara campaign
In 1600, Yoshitaka was seemingly on the Tokugawa side during the Sekigahara campaign, having clashed against Ōtomo Yoshimune at the Battle of Ishigakibaru and also, having participated at the Siege of Yanagawa. In reality, he aimed to conquer the entire region of Kyūshū for his own during the major commotion of the Sekigahara campaign, even momentarily conquering seven of the island's provinces, a feat which ended in failure however due to Tokugawa Ieyasu's victory in the Battle of Sekigahara

Death
After moving to Chikuzen Province which today is part of Fukuoka Prefecture, the Kuroda built a new castle near Hakata-ku, and named it Fukuoka Castle also known as Maizuru Castle or Seki Castle which was completed in the early Edo period for tozama daimyō Kuroda Nagamasa.

After his son Kuroda Nagamasa succeeded him, Yoshitaka died on April 19, 1604.  His grave is in the Namazuta area of Iizuka, Fukuoka, near the original site of Namazuta Castle.

Family
Father: Kuroda Mototaka
Mother: Akashi Masakaze's daughter (1532–1560)
Wife: Kushihashi Teru (1553–1627)
Sons (all by Kushihashi Teru):
Kuroda Nagamasa (known as Shoujumaru in childhood)
Kuroda Kumanosuke (1582–1597)
Adopted sons:
Kuroda Kazushige (1571–1656)

Human Relations
As depicted in historical writings and contemporary television, it is suggested that Kuroda was simultaneously feared by Hideyoshi, despite his attempts to under-estimate his intelligence and influence.  It is alleged that Hideyoshi's fear was due to his overwhelming debt to Yoshitaka, having helped him reign over the whole country as his shadow strategist, with Hideyoshi even believing that the Kuroda might overthrow him eventually. In addition, Kuroda deepened a friendship with Sen no Rikyū, known as the founder of the Japanese tea ceremony "wabi-cha", and who was later put to death by Hideyoshi himself.

Personality
Kuroda was a frugal person, and he sold used military equipment and personal belongings to his vassals. He saved enough money to pay mercenaries in the Sekigahara War due to his thrifty mind. His last words were, "Do not try to gain other people's favor and do not wish for wealth." He was also involved in the project to build principal castles: Himeji castle, Nagoya castle, Osaka castle, and Hiroshima castle under the reign of the Toyotomis.

Popular culture
In the Sengoku Basara games and anime, he is seen with chains attached to a metal ball around his hands, and running gags occur when he is near unlocking his chains.
He is a playable character in the Samurai Warriors 3 & Samurai Warriors 4 video games, he is seen with pale skin and a jade orb as his weapons.

See also
People of the Sengoku period in popular culture for more information on Kuroda Yoshitaka  .
Eiji Yoshikawa, historical fiction
Gunshi Kanbei, the 2014 NHK taiga drama

Notes

Further reading
 Ryōtarō Shiba Harimanada monogatari 播磨灘物語, 1975 vol1~4 Kodansha ~
 Andō Hideo 安藤英男. Shiden Kuroda Josui 史伝黒田如水. Tokyo: Nichibō Shuppansha, 1975.
 Harada Tanemasa 原田種眞. Kuroda Josui 黒田如水. Tokyo: Benseisha 勉誠社, 1996.
 Kaneko Kentarō 金子堅太郎. Kuroda Josui den 黒田如水伝. Tokyo: Bunken Shuppan 文献出版, 1976.
 Motoyama Kazuki 本山一城. Jitsuroku Takenaka Hanbei to Kuroda Kanbei 実錄竹中半兵衛と黒田官兵衛. Tokyo: Murata Shoten 村田書店, 1988.
 Yoshikawa, Eiji. (1989)  Yoshikawa Eiji Rekishi Jidai Bunko (Eiji Yoshikawa's Historical Fiction), Vol. 44: Kuroda Yoshitaka (黒田如水). Tokyo: Kodansha.

External links
Kuroda Kanbei Biography at Samurai-Archives.com

1546 births
1604 deaths
Converts to Roman Catholicism
Daimyo
Samurai
Kuroda clan
Toyotomi retainers
Former Roman Catholics
People from Hyōgo Prefecture
People from Himeji, Hyōgo